Tilts is a hamlet in the Metropolitan Borough of Doncaster, South Yorkshire, England. Aside from some farms, there is a moated site which is a scheduled monument.

References

Hamlets in South Yorkshire
Villages in Doncaster